The Flinders Street Viaduct is a railway bridge in Melbourne, Australia. Made up of six tracks of varying ages, it  links Flinders Street station to Southern Cross station and forms the main link between the eastern and western parts of the Victorian rail network.

The viaduct takes a twisted path, passing behind the former Victorian Railways headquarters at 67 Spencer Street, taking a sharp 90 degree turn east from Spencer Street, swinging southward around the back of the former Fish Market (now Northbank Place and Rebecca Walk) beside Batman Park, then north-east to avoid the swinging basin on the Yarra River, then crossing over the Banana Alley Vaults before entering Flinders Street.

Background
The first railway in Melbourne was opened in 1854 and ran from what is now Flinders Street, to Sandridge (now Port Melbourne) and was later known as the Port Melbourne line. Railways continued to be built from Flinders Street, and the adjacent Princes Bridge station. At the same time, a number of country railways had been built to the west of Melbourne, and used Spencer Street station (now Southern Cross) as the terminus.

Many residents saw the Spencer Street terminal as undesirable and inconvenient, as it was at the edge of the then city, and as early as 1861 a deputation of residents called on the Railway Commissioner to improve matters. It was not until 1879 that the Melbourne Railway Station Junctions Act was passed, which authorised a ground level connection. Three quarters of a mile long, it was classified as a tramway and had limits on the operational speeds, noise and motive power used. In addition, it could only be used at night, and had a level crossing with Queens Bridge Street.

History
The Octopus Act of 1884 was what finally authorised construction of a permanent link, as well as 64 other railway lines around the state. A single track viaduct was opened in November 1891 and the double line opened for goods traffic the next month, but teething problems limited the viaduct to a single line during February 1892. The viaduct was designed and its construction and duplication supervised by Frederick Esling who also was author of a technical paper which identified a puzzling problem related to the horizontal forces on the viaduct due to braking, in combination with side forces from wind-pressure.

The ground level tramway was cut back, but part was retained as a siding to serve the Melbourne Fish Market on Flinders Street, and was not lifted until 1929.

From December 1894 suburban traffic on the Williamstown and Essendon line began to use the viaduct, after the construction of additional platforms at Spencer Street station. To provide for the growing amount of traffic, the viaduct was duplicated in 1915 to provide four tracks in total, with a new bridge being built to one side. The old bridge was then closed and strengthened, being reopened in 1917.

This remained until the 1970s, when in conjunction with the City Loop project, the existing viaduct tracks were made part of four independent loops around the Melbourne central business district. Work begun in December 1975, with the new bridge opened on 11 December 1978. Work then begun on rehabilitating and upgrading the existing bridge, with two tracks being taken out of use at a time. The new bridge was signalled for trains travelling in a single direction on each line, but the four tracks on the older viaduct were resignalled for bidirectional use, as the operation of the City Loop would be reversed between morning and afternoon peaks.

The land under the Viaduct has been used for various uses: when the King Street Bridge was built in 1958 the land was turned over to the City of Melbourne, who used it as a car impound yard for parking offences. This was repealed in 2003 when the Flinders Street overpass of King Street was demolished. The original viaduct was re-decked in 2000, from near Spencer Street through to near Market Street.

In 1997 the Northbank area was redeveloped, with the turning basin expanded and the newer viaduct bathed in blue light by night, in an artwork titled 'Blue Line' by Peter McNeill Stitt that includes  of neon tubing. Construction of apartment buildings on the former fish market site commenced in 2007, and resulted in the railway signals needing to be altered, due to the altered sight lines for trains coming around the curve.

As part of the Northbank Place development in 2010, three 11-storey mixed use towers were built on the former Fish Market site, and the area under the viaduct bordering Batman Park was converted into commercial space named "Rebecca Walk" in reference to the Schooner Rebecca.

Gallery

See also

 Railways in Melbourne

References

Bridges in Melbourne
Bridges completed in 1891
Transport in the City of Melbourne (LGA)
1891 establishments in Australia
Railway bridges in Victoria (Australia)
Buildings and structures in Melbourne City Centre